Ammerländer Schinken – or Ammerländer Knochenschinken – is a type of dry-cured (and normally smoked) ham produced in the Ammerland area of North Germany. It has PGI status under EU law.

The raw meat used in its production is cured for three weeks by being rubbed with a dry mixture of sea salt and brown sugar, and sometimes a spice mixture of juniper, pepper and allspice. The ham is then cold-smoked over beechwood for several weeks, and finally aged for a period of up to two years.

„Ammerländer Schinken“ is a protected geographical indication.

The oldest Ammerland ham smokehouse was founded in 1748 in Apen. Now it also consist a museum.

See also

 List of hams
 List of smoked foods

References

Ham
Smoked meat